The Abaza family (is an Egyptian family of maternal Circassian origin. Abaza is the Circassian name for people from Abkhazia. They have had an influence  in the late 18th century to modern times. They are believed to have a net worth of over US$800 million.

It is known for having produced a large number of politicians under the Muhammad Ali dynasty from the 19th to the mid-20th century. While no individual Abaza has been the ruler or president of Egypt, some Egyptian media have referred to them as one of the "families that rule the country", and as "Egypt's oldest parliamentary dynasty".

The Abaza family has also contributed to modern Arabic literature and art through the works of journalist and political activist Fekry Pasha Abaza, author Desouky Bek Abaza, poet Aziz Pasha Abaza, novelist Tharwat Abaza, actor Rushdy Abaza, among others.

They are thought to number around 50,000 members.

History 
Sources indicate that the Abaza family were already well established in the Nile Delta by the late 18th century, they took – or were given – the last name "Abaza". A belief among the Abaza family is that they were named after "a beloved grandmother ... or her place of birth". This maternal ancestor is thought to have married the head of the powerful El Ayed family prior to the reign of Muhammad Ali of Egypt. Many elders of the family sat on the Majlis created by Ibrahim Pasha. The monarchy had also endowed the family with villages and lands allowing the Abazas to flourish.

Hassan Pasha Abaza is widely considered to be the modern founding father of the family, also titled Sheikh of the Arabs, a title given to the heads of sufficiently influential families at the time. Other Abazas received variations on the title, such as Shiekh Boghdady Pasha Abaza who, along with Hassan Pasha, served in Ibrahim Pasha's Majlis making the Abazas the only family to hold two seats at the same time.

On one occasion, during the accession of the young King Farouk, the Abaza family solicited palace authorities to permit the royal train to stop briefly, at their village, so that the king could partake in refreshments which were offered in a large, ornate tent they had erected at the train station.

In 2014, the family sued Sada Elbalad TV for the creation of a children's cartoon named Abaza and the program was forced off the air. In the same year Egyptian satellite channel CBC Two aired a one-hour documentary about the family.

A lentil dish attributed to the family is known in the country as ads abazy".

Notable members
Notable family members include Wagih Abaza, who served as governor in several Egyptian governorates including Sharqia, Cairo, Beheira and Gharbia. Wagih Abaza was an active member of the Free Officers Movement that toppled the Egyptian monarchy and forced King Farouk to abdicate in 1952. Mohammad Abdel Rahman Hussein Abaza Councilor and author of a series of publications on the struggle of the Egyptians against the British occupation and was personally involved in the liberation campaign and struggle against the British.

The family is known for their contributions to modern Arabic literature through the works of Aziz Pasha Abaza and Tharwat Abaza, as well as the journalism and political activism of Fekry Pasha Abaza. Tharwat was a journalist and novelist who opposed the nationalization of the Suez Canal. His best-known novel, A Man Escaping from Time, was televised in the late 1960s.

Rushdy Abaza, an actor with no less than 150 movies to his name, was not chosen to star in Lawrence of Arabia but acted "like a star" during the audition.

Tharwat Abaza's daughter, Amina Tharwat Abaza, is an active member of Egypt's animal rights community, having founded the country's first and largest animal rights organization, the Society for Protection of Animal Rights in Egypt.

Other notable members of the family include the longest-serving minister in Egyptian history, Maher Abaza. He was the Minister of Electricity and Energy and is credited with connecting the vast majority of the country's rural areas to the electric grid.

Their main stronghold was the governorate of Sharqia. Several villages in the Nile Delta are named after members of the family, mainly concentrated around the town of Kafr Abaza. For decades, the family had a political monopoly over several districts.

In the 2015 parliamentary elections, three members of the Abaza family won seats in the House of Representatives and this was criticized by some in the media referring to their win as "dynastic heredity".

See also 
 Abaza (disambiguation)
 Sharqia Governorate

References

External links 
Abaza Group
Aziz Pasha Abaza archive at Bibliotheca Alexandrina
 Abaza Family Facebook Page
Mahmoud Abaza Remarks
Archive Egypt:Egypt's Four Largest Parliamentary Dynasties
President Sisi Delegate to the Abaza Clan
Families That Form Egyptian Political Life

Egyptian families
History of literature in Egypt
Egyptian culture
Abazins
Egyptian people of Abkhazian descent
Egyptian people of Circassian descent
Arab culture
Noble families
Egyptian nobility
Egyptian pashas